This is a list of awards received by American streaming media company Netflix.

American Cinema Editors Awards
Best Edited Feature Film — Dramatic

Best Edited Feature Film — Comedy or Musical

Best Edited Half-Hour Series for Television

Best Edited One Hour Series for Non-Commercial Television

Best Edited Comedy Series for Non-Commercial Television

Best Edited Drama Series for Non-Commercial Television

Best Edited Mini-Series or Motion Picture for Television

Best Edited Documentary Feature

Best Edited Documentary for Television

American Society of Cinematographers Awards
Outstanding Achievement in Cinematography in Theatrical Release

Outstanding Achievement in Cinematography in Episode of a Regular Series

Outstanding Achievement in Cinematography in Television Movie, Miniseries, or Pilot

Spotlight Award

Outstanding Achievement in Cinematography in Regular Series for Non-Commercial Television

Art Directors Guild Awards
Period Film

Half Hour Single-Camera Television Series

One-Hour Contemporary Single-Camera Series

One-Hour Period or Fantasy Single-Camera Television Series

Multi-Camera Series

Television Movie or Limited Series

Variety or Competition Series/Awards or Event Special

Artios Awards
Achievement in Casting – Television Pilot Drama

Outstanding Achievement in Casting – Television Pilot Comedy

Achievement in Casting – Television Series Drama

Outstanding Achievement in Casting – Television Series Comedy

Achievement in Casting – Television Animation Adult

Achievement in Casting – Television Animation Children

Achievement in Casting – Children's Pilot and Series (Live Action)

Cinema Audio Society Awards
Outstanding Achievement in Sound Mixing for Television Series – One Hour

Outstanding Achievement in Sound Mixing for a Television Movie or Mini-Series

Costume Designers Guild Awards
Excellence in Costume Design for a Contemporary Television Series

Excellence in Costume Design for a Period Series

Excellence in Costume Design for a Contemporary Film

Directors Guild of America Awards
Outstanding Directing – Drama Series

Outstanding Directing – Comedy Series

Outstanding Directing – Documentaries

Golden Reel Awards
Best Sound Editing in Television, Short Form — Music Score

Best Sound Editing in Television, Short Form — Music

Best Sound Editing in Television, Short Form — Dialogue/ADR

Best Sound Editing in Television, Animation — Effects/Foley/Dialogue/ADR

Best Sound Editing in Television, Documentary Short Form – Effects/Foley/Dialogue/ADR

Best Sound Editing in Television, Long Form — Musical

Best Sound Editing in Television, Short Form – FX/Foley

Best Sound Editing in Television, Short Form — Musical

References

Lists of accolades received by Netflix